Lissoclinum patella is a species of ascidian in the family Didemnidae.

Description
Lissoclinum patella is a sprawling ascidian that grows in coastal areas near Indonesia and Australia, including the Great Barrier Reef. Its green hue is due to the colonies of cyanobacteria that grow within its tissue as symbionts, one known species is Prochloron didemni. The biochemical products of its cyanobacteria is an active area of research, as example the circular peptide, Patellamide A.

Distribution
This species is found in the tropical eastern Indian Ocean and the western Pacific Ocean. Its range includes the Philippines, Indonesia and northern Australia.

References

Schreiber, U., et al. "Assessment of photosynthetic performance of Prochloron in Lissoclinum patella in hospite by chlorophyll fluorescence measurements." Plant and Cell Physiology 38.8 (1997): 945-951.

External links

Enterogona